About Mrs. Leslie is a 1954 American drama film directed by Daniel Mann and starring Shirley Booth and Robert Ryan. It was nominated for a BAFTA Award in 1955.

Plot
Rooming house owner Vivien Leslie reminisces in flashbacks about her past and her transition from a nightclub entertainer to a dress-shop owner. She had a longtime but mostly platonic affair with the mysterious, lonely aviation industrialist George Leslie, who had originally hired her as a vacation companion. Though they enjoy each other's company annually at a peaceful oceanside retreat, George tells Vivien nothing of his life until she accidentally learns of his career and marriage. George, who has taken an important government job during the war, is killed, and his will decrees that Vivien may purchase a house.

Vivien's neighbors and tenants include a young couple aspiring to television success and a dimwitted teenage girl.

Cast
Shirley Booth as Mrs. Vivien Leslie
Robert Ryan as George Leslie
Marjie Millar as Nadine Roland
Alex Nicol as Lan McKay
Sammy White as Harry Willey
James Bell as Herbert Poole
Eilene Janssen as Pixie Croffman
Philip Ober as Mort Finley
Harry Morgan as Fred Blue
Ann McCrea as Nightclub girl

Production

The film is based on the novel About Mrs. Leslie by Viña Delmar. Paramount purchased the rights to Delmar's novel in June 1950, and tentatively assigned the project to George Stevens.

In September 1953, The Hollywood Reporter reported that Paul Nathan, story editor and casting director for the "recently dissolved Hal Wallis Productions," was to "start work" on the picture, but the exact nature and extent of his contribution have not been determined.

Reception 
In a contemporary review for The New York Times, critic A. H. Weiler called the film "a somewhat lengthy tale, cluttered by some distracting flashbacks" and "a memory book that is only occasionally arresting." However, Weiler praised Shirley Booth's performance: "Although Miss Booth appears to be mismated, she transcends the stereotyped situations by sensitive emoting and timing. While it is too much to expect her to make the story more brisk and sparkling, she does make 'Mrs. Leslie' appear genuinely alive and strong."

References

External links

About Mrs. Leslie (1954) at TCM Movie Database

1954 films
1954 drama films
American drama films
American black-and-white films
Films scored by Victor Young
Films based on American novels
Films directed by Daniel Mann
Films produced by Hal B. Wallis
Films set in California
Films set in New York City
Paramount Pictures films
Films with screenplays by Ketti Frings
Films based on works by Viña Delmar
1950s English-language films
1950s American films